Malavan Sport and Cultural Club is an Iranian multisport club based in Bandar Anzali, Iran. Bandar Anzali with 150,000 citizens has 64 sport clubs with 11,000 male and female athletes. It was established by Marshal Karim Rastegari in 1969 under the supervision of the Iranian Navy and to begin with only had a football team which still exists today as Malavan Football Club.

Divisions

Football 
Malavan Football Club who play in the Persian Gulf Pro League. The team has boasted fantastic players such as the late Sirous Ghayeghran, and today boasts Maziar Zare, hailed by many as The New Ghayegran.

The reserve team of Malavan named Malavan Novin play in the Gilan Provincial League.

Boating 
All of Iran's national boating team are from Anzali and have won several Asian and International medals. From 1999-2003 they were Champions of Iran in the adult and youth championships and 2002 and 2003 they came 2nd in the Asian Championships. All the players and coaches of the Iranian national boating team are from Malavan. They have acquired more than 20 gold, silver & bronze medals in Asian Championships.

Basketball 
Malavan have a team in Iran's Professional Basketball League, and many of their players play at youth level for Iran.

Futsal 
Malavan's futsal team currently participate in Iran's Serie B Futsal League however Malavan are the number one favourite for promotion in the 2006/07 Season.

Boxing 
They have won several medals over the years and several Malavan boxers box for Iran at international level.

Karate 
Malavan has produced some very famous boxers such as:

Maziar Farid Khomami (Former number one in Asia, now coach of Iran national team)

Jasem Vishgahi (Former Asia number one, world number one)

Mohammad Rabii (Former World youth number one) who died in a preparation camp.

Water polo

Women's Boating 
Malavan Women's Boating team has over 40 players. 10 of them have Iran gold medals in country championships and Ms Nikpoor is West Asian Champion.

Women's Futsal 
Head coach : Maryam Irandust

Team : Irandust, Sami, Mikaeili, Hasrati, Dustpoor, Azizpur, Agahi, Eghbal, Mehrvar, Abdi, Noori, Irandust and Nemati

Bodybuilding

Volleyball

External links
  Official Website

Multi-sport clubs in Iran
Sports clubs established in 1969
Sport in Iran
1969 establishments in Iran